The Nepal women's national football team is controlled by the All Nepal Football Association and represents Nepal in international women's football competitions. The Women's Football Department is developed to control and manage the women's football activities. The official motto of women's football in Nepal is "Football for Change". It is a member of the Asian Football Confederation and the South Asian Football Federation and has yet to qualify for the World Cup.

History

Formation

Nepal formed a women's national team in the mid-1980s and debuted in the 1986 AFC Women's Championship. During the start of the tournament, Nepal played their first official match against Hong Kong (14 December 1986), which they lost with a score of 1–0. Nepal women's side also participated in the final three phases of the Asian Cup in 1986, 1989 and 1999, never going beyond the group stages. Nepal proved to be in a difficult group with former champions Thailand, alongside Indonesia and Hong Kong, two relatively strong teams. As a result, Nepal had lost all three matches, two of them jarringly, while the match against Hong Kong proved to be a steady profit. In 1989 Nepal played again in the championship, against the same opponents, except that Thailand was substituted against Japan. This resulted in meagre points for Nepal, who lost every game by a wide margin, the smallest 0–3 against Hong Kong.

Nepal's FIFA First Vice President was Kamal Thapa. Nepal's first woman captain was Rama Singh when the Nepali women's football team was created, Kamal Thapa was the president of the All Nepal Football Association. Singh, who represented the Bagmati team, started playing in 1985. The second national team's captain was Kamala Hirachan who also represented the Gandaki team and the third women captain was Meera Chaudhary who represented Naryani team. Singh later became the first newsreader in Nepali television history, and Chaudhary has held a rank of DSP in Nepal police. The first female international goal scorer of Nepal is Pema Dolma Lama, who scored a goal against Uzbekistan at the 1999 AFC Women's Championship held in Philippines.

Crisis years
As a result of the democracy uprising in 1990, there was an eight-year period without a women's national team. This negatively affected player recruitment, but nevertheless Nepal soon returned to international football during the Women's Asian Cup in 1999. Despite their triumphant return, the results were about the same as before the eight-year hiatus. The championship ended in the group-stage with Japan, Thailand, Uzbekistan and the Philippines, where Nepal lost all four games. Since then, Nepal has not appeared in the Women's Asian cup. Former men's national team technical director, Holger Obermann served as the technical advisor for the Chelis during their 1999 campaign.

However, this did not mean that Nepal had not played football since 1999. The Mangladevi League, roughly a month-long women's football tourney, was set up trying to bring in women football players across the country. It was played in early 2000, in a league-cum-knockout basis. It was an initiative taken by a single person, but sadly discontinued after a year.

Nepal had a long period without matches, but they impressed many in the South Asian Games in 2010, where they reached the final after beating several opponents by a wide margin. In the finals they lost narrowly 1–3 against the big favorite India. This gave the national team a much needed recognition. The 11th South Asian Games also were the first to host a women's football event as well. In the opening match of the 2010 South Asian Games, Nepal women's U23 faced hosts Bangladesh, where they won with a single goal. The second match against Sri Lanka proved to be more illustrious as victory came in the form of 8 goals while holding a clean sheet. However, the scoring spree was short lived as the third group-stage match against India saw a heavy 0–5 loss. Nevertheless, Nepal had done enough to qualify for the second round (semi finals) against Pakistan which they won with a resounding 7–0 scoreline. This meant that Nepal would face a difficult rematch against India in the finals, although any result would ensure a medal at the very least for the Chelis. Despite finally ending the scoring drought against India, the game was lost 1–3. Despite putting on a valiant performance, the Chelis returned home with a silver medal which came to the delight of many supporters of Nepali football due to the rarity of the occasion.

Regeneration
The regeneration of Women's football in Nepal was first realised when after the national leagues were reinstated in 2009. The women's national team prior to this, hadn't played an international game for 5 years. Nevertheless, the Chelis began training for two upcoming major international tournaments in the following year. In 2010, Nepali women footballers returned with two runner-up trophies, one from the 11th South Asian Games, and the other from the SAFF Women's Football Championship. Despite limited training, resources and less attention compared to the men's team, the women's team had performed exceedingly well internationally. In the South Asian Games, they defeated Sri Lanka 8–0, and in SAFF they thrashed Afghanistan 13–0 and Pakistan 11–0. Striker Anu Lama was the star of SAFF, scoring three hat-tricks to be declared the best player of the tournament. However, the team was defeated 0–5 by India in the SAG final, but it was a much more closely fought match when they lost 0–1 to the same team in the SAFF final recently.

Following the team's regeneration since 2010, the women's side rose 22 places in the FIFA ranking.

Team image

Nicknames
The Nepal women's national football team has been known or nicknamed as the "Nepali Chelis".

Home stadium

The team's home ground are various around the nation also shared with the Nepal national football team at the Dasarath Rangasala Stadium, a multi-purpose stadium in central Kathmandu, Nepal. Holding 25,000 spectators, of which 5,000 seated, it is the biggest stadium in Nepal. It is named after Dashrath Chand, one of the martyrs of Nepal. Prior to the 2013 SAFF Championship in Nepal, the Dasarath Rangasala underwent heavy renovation that saw several improvements such as the expansion of seats from 20,000 to 25,000.

Results and fixtures

The following is a list of match results in the last 12 months, as well as any future matches that have been scheduled.
Legend

2022

2023

All-time results

 counted for the FIFA A-level matches only.

Coaching staff and team officials
As of February 2021

Players

Current squad
 The following players were named on for the 2020 AFC Women's Olympic Qualifying Tournament (Second round) on 3 April 2019.

Notable players
Rama Singh
Anu Lama
Jamuna Gurung
Sajana Rana
Sabitra Bhandari
Lila Lamgade
-Best goalkeeper of the Year 2013, 2014 and 2015

Honours

Regional
 SAFF Women's Championship
Runners-up: 2010, 2012, 2014, 2019, 2022

 South Asian Games
Runners-up: 2010, 2016, 2019

Other tournaments
 Nadezhda Cup
Runners-up: 2019

 Women's Gold Cup
Runners-up: 2019

Competitive record
*Draws include knockout matches decided on penalty kicks.
***Red border colour indicates tournament was held on home soil.

FIFA Women's World Cup

AFC Women's Asian Cup

SAFF Women's Championship

South Asian Games

Other tournaments

See also

Sport in Nepal
Football in Nepal
Women's football in Nepal
All Nepal Football Association
Nepal women's national under-23 football team
Nepal women's national under-20 football team
Nepal women's national under-17 football team
Nepal national football team
Nepal national under-20 football team
Nepal national under-17 football team
Nepal at the Asian Games

References

External links
Official website, the-ANFA.com 

 
Asian women's national association football teams
Nat